= Bloomsbury Set (band) =

British pop music band

- Origin: United Kingdom
- Genres: Pop
- Labels: Stiletto Records

Bloomsbury Set was a British male vocal/instrumental pop group, consisting of the brothers Andy Lloyd (vocals) and Gary Lloyd (bass), plus Paul Faulkner (guitar), Jon Bates [keyboards], and Jim Simpson (drums). They had chart success with their single "Hanging Around with the Big Boys", released on the Stiletto label. It entered the UK Singles Chart on 25 June 1983, reaching #56. It was in the chart for three weeks. Another 1983 single featured two songs: "Dress Parade" and "Serenade". The songs were recorded in July of that year at Mayfair Studios and Comforts Place (Stiletto Records Ltd).
